Judith Freedman, Lady Freedman , is a British solicitor and academic. 

Freedman is the Pinsent Masons Professor of Taxation Law and Policy at the University of Oxford and senior research fellow at Worcester College. She was the inaugural professor of taxation law at Oxford from 2001-19. She had previously worked in the corporate tax department of Freshfields before joining the University of Surrey as a lecturer in law in 1980. She then moved to the London School of Economics (LSE) with a secondment to the Institute of Advanced Legal Studies as senior research fellow in Company and Commercial Law (1989-92).

Family
She is married to Sir Lawrence Freedman, Emeritus Professor of War Studies at King's College London.

References

Living people
Place of birth missing (living people)
British legal scholars
Fellows of Worcester College, Oxford
Fellows of the British Academy
Commanders of the Order of the British Empire
Wives of knights
Scholars of tax law
1953 births
Alumni of Lady Margaret Hall, Oxford
British solicitors
Academics of the University of Surrey
Academics of the London School of Economics